Aleksandr Vladimirovich Yashan (born 22 April 1990) is a Russian former professional football player.

Club career
He made his Russian Football National League debut for FC Luch-Energiya Vladivostok on 14 May 2009 in a game against FC Nizhny Novgorod. That was his only season in the FNL so far.

External links
 
 

1990 births
People from Blagoveshchensk
Living people
Russian footballers
Association football midfielders
FC Luch Vladivostok players
FC Okean Nakhodka players
FC Smena Komsomolsk-na-Amure players
FC Chita players
Sportspeople from Amur Oblast